Eustație Altini (Greek: Ευστάθιος Αλτίνης; c.1772, Zagora - 1815, Iași) was a Moldavian painter of Greek ancestry; specializing in decorative art and iconostases.  He studied in Austria with famous painters Heinrich Friedrich Füger, Johann Baptist Lampi and Hubert Maurer.  He was one of few Greek painters to migrate outside of Greece, others included El Greco and Belisario Corenzio.  His work completely escaped the typical Greek mannerisms prevalent within the work of his contemporaries.  He adapted a unique style mainly influenced by German Austrian art.  He influenced 19th-century Romanian art.

Life and work 

He was born in Zagora, Greece, when it was still part of the Ottoman Empire. In 1780, following the Orlov Revolt and continued Russian involvement in Greece, supporters of Greek independence were persecuted, so his family fled to Iași which, at that time, was a border city in a semi-autonomous province, under control of the Phanariots. There, he first studied art with a local painter named Nicolae.    

His talent attracted attention so, in 1789, with the support of Alexander Ypsilantis, Voivode of Wallachia, he was able to go to Vienna to enroll at the Academy of Fine Arts. There, he studied with Heinrich Friedrich Füger, Johann Baptist Lampi and Hubert Maurer. This was his first major exposure to Western art. Later, he would successfully incorporate perspective and chiaroscuro into traditional icon painting. As Iași was under Russian occupation during that period, Prince Grigory Potemkin has also been credited as being his patron. This, however, has not been verified.    

In 1802, he created his first known iconstasis at Banu Church in  Iași. It was commissioned by Iacob Stamati (1748-1803), the Metropolitan of Moldavia, who was an admirer of the Russian Enlightenment. Some of his best-known iconostases were those created for Saint Spyridon Church in 1813, one of which depicted an episode in the life of Metropolitan , who had commissioned the work.     

During his last years, he led a painting class at the Princely Academy of Iași.

Gallery

References

Sources 
 Corinne Julien, Histoire de l'humanité, Vol.6, UNESCO, 2000  pg.888 (Online)
 Remus Niculescu, "Altini, Eustatie", Oxford Art Online, Oxford University Press, 2003  (Online )

External links

 "Primitivii picturii românești moderne – partea a doua" @ Arta din România

1770s births
1815 deaths
Greek painters
Moldovan painters
Icon painters
Decorative arts
Religious artists
Academy of Fine Arts Vienna alumni
People from Zagora, Greece
18th-century Greek painters
19th-century Greek painters
Painters from the Ottoman Empire